The Hong Kong grouper (Epinephelus akaara)  is a species of marine ray-finned fish, a grouper from the subfamily Epinephelinae which is part of the family Serranidae, which also includes the anthias and sea basses. It is found in eastern and southeastern Asian waters of the Western Pacific Ocean. Its natural habitats are shallow seas and coral reefs.

Description
The Hong Kong grouper has a body which has a standard length which is around 2.7-3.2 times the depth of its body. The dorsal profile of the head is convex between the eyes. The preopercle is rounded and serrated with the serrations at its angle enlarged. The dorsal fin contains 11 spines and 15-17 soft rays while the anal fin has 3 spines and 8 soft rays. The caudal fin is rounded and the pelvic fin does not extend as far as the anus. There are 61-64 scales in the lateral line. The head and body have a pale brownish grey background colour, with the flanks and back covered with small red, orange or gold spots. There are 6 indistinct diagonal dark bars which can normally be seen on at least towards the back. The first bar is on the nape, the third bar runs through a dark brown or black blotch on the body at base of rearmost 3 spines of the dorsal fin while the final bar is on the caudal peduncle. These dark bars reach the base of dorsal fin. The margin of the dorsal fin is yellow or orange with a line of dusky yellow or orange spots along middle of spiny part of that dorsal fin and another along base of the fin. These rows have one spot on each membrane. The soft part of the dorsal fin as well as the caudal and anal fins have indistinct red or orange spots at their bases and dusky membranes faintly marked with small white spots.

Distribution 
The Hong Kong grouper is found in the Western Pacific Ocean. It is found in southern Japan where it occurs in the Tsugaru Strait, the strait between Honshu and Hokkaido south along both coasts. It is also found off Korea, China and Taiwan as far as the Gulf of Tonkin. It may be found off Vietnam but this needs to be confirmed as the lone reported specimen may be a misidentification of Epinephelus fasciatomaculosus. There are unsubstantiated records from India and the Philippines.

Habitat and biology
The Hong Kong grouper is found in coral and rocky reefs down to depths of at least  while juveniles prefer shallower waters than the adults. Around Japan he species is common in rocky areas. Around the Byeonsan Peninsula of the Republic of Korea spawning has been observed in late July and early August. Spawning aggregations have not been confirmed in this species although there are anecdotal reports from Hong Kong of divers encountering groups of up to 50 fishes in close proximity on reefs in the summer, coinciding with the known spawning season.

As other fish, the Hong Kong grouper harbours parasites, including, among others, the diplectanid monogenean Pseudorhabdosynochus satyui and Pseudorhabdosynochus epinepheli, parasitic on the gills.

Taxonomy
The Hong Kong grouper was first formally described as Serranus akaara in 1842 by the Dutch zoologist Coenraad Jacob Temminck (1778-1858) and his student, the German ichthyologist Hermann Schlegel (1804-1884), with the type locality given as Nagasaki.

Utlisation
The Hong Kong grouper is regarded as a species of high commercial value in Hong Kong and Japan. It is usually caught by hand-line over rock strata and the species is often marketed live to increase the price paid. It has been bred in aquaculture but the survival of the hatched larvae is low. By the mid 1990s the wild population was exhausted as a viable fishery.

Conservation
The Hong Kong grouper has no effectively managed stocks. In China there are limits on the gear which can be used but in Hong Kong the fishing is largely unregulated, except a small no take zone where the species may actually be increasing. Hatchery reared larvae are released in Japanese waters but there are no known conservation measures in other parts of its range.

References

Epinephelus
Fish described in 1842
Taxonomy articles created by Polbot